Andrea Branzi (born November 30, 1938) is a Florence-born Italian architect and designer. He currently lives and works in Milan and was a professor and chairman of the School of Interior Design at the Polytechnic University of Milan until 2009.

Education and background 
Studied as an architect at the Florence School of Architecture, Branzi received his degree in 1966 and founded Archizoom Associati with Gilberto Corretti, Paolo Deganello, Massimo Morozzi in 1966 in Florence where they developed the No-Stop City. In 1976, he established Studio Alchimia and in the 1980s began to associate with the Memphis Group. Branzi also served as the cultural director of Domus Academy, Italy’s first postgraduate design school, for its first ten years. His design works are included in permanent collections such as the Centre Georges Pompidou, Paris; the Metropolitan Museum of Art, New York; Museum of Fine Arts Houston, Houston; Museum of Modern Art, New York; Victoria & Albert Museum, London; Vitra Design Museum, Weil am Rhein, and so on.

Awards and honors 
In 1979, Andrea Branzi was awarded the prestigious Italian industrial design award Compasso d'Oro.

In 2005, Branzi received his second Compasso d'Oro Award.

In 2008, he was named an Honorary Royal Designer for Industry by the Royal Society for the encouragement of Arts, Manufactures and Commerce (RSA) in the UK.

On October 15, 2018, he was awarded the Rolf Schock Prizes by the Royal Swedish Academy of Fine Arts.

References

External links 

 Official Website of Andrea Branzi
 Over Design Over
 Intervista per Lezioni di Design su Rai Educational
 Foto dell'inaugurazione presso la galleria TINGO della serie di Ceramiche Portali.

Rolf Schock Prize laureates
Compasso d'Oro Award recipients
Italian designers
1938 births
Living people